Phocis Football Clubs Association ("Phocis or Fokida F.C.A.", Greek: Ένωση Ποδοσφαιρικών Σωματείων Φωκίδας Enosis Podosfairikon Somateion Fokidas) is one of the newest Greek amateur football clubs associations, representing teams from the Greek prefecture of Phocis.  The association was founded in 1984 after breaking up from the old Phocis-Phthiotida Football Clubs Association.

Organization
The association is a member of the Hellenic Football Federation and organizes a regional football league and cup.

List of champions

Championships
1986 Asteras Itea
1987 Isaias Desfina
1988 Fokikos
1989 Asteras Itea
1990 Fokikos
1991 Isaia Desfina
1992 Diagoras Polydrosos
1993 Asteras Itea
1994 Diagoras Polydrosos
1995 Asteras Itea
1996 Diagoras Polydrosos
1997 Asteras Itea
1998 Fokikos
1999 Dorikos Nea Dorida
2000 Asteras Itea
2001 Fokikos
2002 Fokikos
2003 Asteras Itea
2004 Androutsos Gravia
2005 Asteras Itea
2006 Fokikos
2007 Asteras Itea
2008 A.O. Kehagias
2009 Apollon Efpalio
2010 Dorikos Nea Dorida
2011 Diagoras Polydrosos
2012 Androutsos Gravia

Cup Phocis

1986 Asteras Itea
1987 Fokikos
1988 Asteras Itea
1989 Fokikos
1990 Fokikos
1991 Isaia Desfina
1992 Fokikos
1993 Asteras Itea
1994 Fokikos
1995 Fokikos
1996 Asteras Itea
1997 Asteras Itea
1998 Asteras Itea
1999 Asteras Itea
2000 Fokikos
2001 Fokikos
2002 Asteras Itea
2003 Fokikos
2004 Fokikos
2005 Androutsos Gravia
2006 Androutsos Gravia
2007 Fokikos
2008 Asteras Itea
2009 Asteras Itea
2010 Apollon Efpalio
2011 A.C. Tolofona/Eratini
2012 Amfissaikos 2006

References

rssf

Football
Sports organizations established in 1985
Association football governing bodies in Greece
1985 establishments in Greece